Co-op Radio is the short name of some radio stations operated by cooperatives:

Imagesound's in-store audio for stores in the British Co-op grocery store chain
Kootenay Co-op Radio CJLY-FM in Nelson, British Columbia, Canada
UNW Co-op Radio in Keston, Kent, United Kingdom
Vancouver Co-operative Radio CFRO-FM in Vancouver, British Columbia, Canada